Tiruvannamalai special grade municipality is the civic agency which governs urban area of Tiruvannamalai in the south Indian state of Tamil Nadu.
.
It was first constituted as Municipal body in the year 1866, being one of the oldest surviving municipal agency of Madras presidency. later upgraded into Second grade, first grade and selection grade municipalities  in the past century and currently a special Grade municipal body, a superior agency with municipality status from the year 2008.

References

Tiruvannamalai